Kangerlussuaq Fjord or Kangerlussuaq Inlet is a fjord in Avannaata Municipality, Western Greenland. It is located at the Kangeq Peninsula in the Upernavik Archipelago zone. This fjord cuts across the peninsula in a north–south direction.

See also
List of fjords of Greenland

References 

Fjords of the Upernavik Archipelago